is a Japanese film director and actor.

Career
Rijū started making 8mm films in high school, and his Kyōkun I earned a spot at the 1980 Pia Film Festival. In 1981, he made his acting debut with a starring role in the TBS drama Fubo no gosan. The same year, he participated in the production of Kihachi Okamoto's At This Late Date, the Charleston, not only starring, but also co-authoring the script and serving as assistant director. As an actor, he has appeared in films directed by Juzo Itami, Yoichi Sai, Kaizo Hayashi, and Shinji Aoyama; as well as TV dramas such as Kinpachi-sensei and Hanzawa Naoki.

As a director, his film Elephant Song won the NETPAC Award at the 1995 Berlin Film Festival. His next work Berlin (1995) earned him the Directors Guild of Japan New Directors Award. His 2001 film Chloe was selected for the competition at the Berlin Film Festival.

Filmography
As actor
Television
 Fubo no gosan (1981)
 Tokugawa Ieyasu (1983), Toyotomi Hideyori
 Kinpachi-sensei (2001–02)
 Fūrin Kazan (2007), Narita Nagayasu
 Drifting Net Cafe (2009)
 Ryōmaden (2010), Maki Yasuomi
 Ariadne no Dangan (2011)
 Ataru (2012)
 Hanzawa Naoki (2013)
 A Warmed Up Love (2020), Seiichirō Tsuzuki
 The Supporting Actors 3 (2021), himself
 Hiru (2022)
 Gannibal (2022)

Film
 At This Late Date, the Charleston (1981)
 KT (2002)
 The Edge of Sin (2015)
 Ice Cream and the Sound of Raindrops (2017)
 Last Winter, We Parted (2018)
 Family Bond (2020)
 True Mothers (2020), Hamano
 The Sound of Grass (2021)
 Haw (2022)

As director
 Elephant Son] (1994)
 Berlin (1995)
 Chloe'' (2001)

References

External links

1962 births
Living people
Japanese film directors
Japanese male television actors
Male actors from Yokohama
Japanese male film actors
20th-century Japanese male actors
21st-century Japanese male actors